Alan Keith, OBE (born Alexander Kossoff; 19 October 1908 – 17 March 2003) was a British actor, disc jockey and radio presenter, noted for being the longest-serving and eldest presenter on British radio by the time of his death aged 94.

Background
Alexander "Alec" Kossoff was born in Hackney, London, the eldest of three children of Russian-Jewish parents. He was educated at Dame Alice Owen's School in Islington, and in 1926 he won a scholarship to the Royal Academy of Dramatic Art, where he anglicised his name to Alan Keith. He graduated in 1928 with the silver medal, and spent the next eight years on the West End and Broadway stage.

Career
By 1935, Alan Keith was already an established voice on BBC radio, appearing in dozens of radio plays as a member of the drama stock company and spending three years as an interviewer for In Town Tonight. He also acted in films, appearing in Dangerous Moonlight (1941), The World Owes Me a Living (1945), The Long Knife (1958) and Yesterday's Enemy (1959). In pre-war television broadcasts, he discovered he had a facility with American accents, and he continued to play American characters on television and radio through the 1940s and 1950s.

Your Hundred Best Tunes
Beginning in the early 1950s, he devoted time to devising and presenting music programmes for the BBC. In 1959, he devised Your Hundred Best Tunes, a programme of famous classical music, operetta and ballads. Keith chose the original 100 pieces himself. Many works were suggested by listeners and played in the programme. Thus a good many more than 100 works were played and the list evolved. Therefore, in subsequent years, a 100 Best were periodically voted for by listeners. Keith was awarded an OBE in 1991 for services to broadcasting. In early March 2003, at the age of 94, he recorded an announcement that he intended to retire from the programme after 44 years. However, he fell ill almost immediately afterward, and before long died; his final programme was broadcast 12 days after his death.

Family
Keith married Pearl Rebuck in 1941. Their son Sir Brian Keith was for some years from 2001 a judge in the High Court of England and Wales; their daughter Linda Keith was formerly a bohemian socialite, and is known for her associations with the Rolling Stones and Jimi Hendrix.

Alan Keith was the elder brother of fellow actor David Kossoff, whose son Paul Kossoff was guitarist with the rock band Free.

Partial filmography
The Avenging Hand (1936) - Receptionist (uncredited)
Dangerous Moonlight (1941) - (uncredited)
Give Us the Moon (1944) - Raphael
The World Owes Me a Living (1945) - Flying circus manager (uncredited)
The Long Knife (1958) - Dr. Ian Probus
Yesterday's Enemy (1959) - Bendish (uncredited)
80,000 Suspects (1963) - Health Inspector Sanders (uncredited)

References

External links 
 Obituary, The Independent, 19 March 2003
 Obituary, The Daily Telegraph, 19 March 2003

1908 births
2003 deaths
English radio DJs
English radio presenters
BBC Radio 2 presenters
Classical music radio presenters
English radio people
English Jews
English people of Russian-Jewish descent
People from the London Borough of Hackney
People educated at Dame Alice Owen's School
Officers of the Order of the British Empire
Alumni of RADA
English male film actors
English male radio actors
English male stage actors
English male television actors
Kossoff family